Aleksandrs Ņiživijs (born September 16, 1976) is a former Latvian professional ice hockey player. His last club was Dinamo Riga of the Kontinental Hockey League (KHL). He was also a regular Latvia national ice hockey team player.

International play
He was named to the Latvia men's national ice hockey team for competition at the 2014 IIHF World Championship.

Career statistics

Regular season and playoffs

International

References

External links
 
 
 
 

1976 births
Living people
Dinamo Riga players
Expatriate ice hockey players in Russia
HC Dynamo Moscow players
Ice hockey players at the 2002 Winter Olympics
Ice hockey players at the 2006 Winter Olympics
Ice hockey players at the 2010 Winter Olympics
Latvian ice hockey right wingers
Lokomotiv Yaroslavl players
Molot-Prikamye Perm players
Olympic ice hockey players of Latvia
Ice hockey people from Riga
Torpedo Nizhny Novgorod players